List of Famous Bangladeshi Actressesː

A 

 Anwara
 Apu Biswas
 Aparna Ghosh
 Anju Ghosh
 Alisha Pradhan
 Afsana Mimi
 Achol
 Akhi Alamgir
 Anjana Sultana
 Airin Sultana
 Amrita Khan

B 

 Badhon
 Barsha
 Bindu
 Bonna Mirza
 Bijori Barkatullah
 Bubly
 Babita
 Bobby
 Bipasha Hayat

C 

 Champa
 Chandni
 Chitralekha Guho

D 

 Dolly Johur
 Dilruba Yasmeen Ruhee
 Diti
 Dilara Zaman

I 

 Ishrat Jahan Chaity
 Ishita

J 

 Jaya Ahsan
 Jannatul Ferdous Peya
 Jyotika Jyoti
 Jannatul Ferdous Oishee

K 

 Kabori
 Keya

L 

 Lucky Enam
 Lima
 Leesa Gazi
 Lucy Tripti Gomes

M 

 Mim Mantasha
 Moushumi
 Moushumi Hamid
 Mahiya Mahi
 Mehazabien
 Mahbuba Islam Rakhi
 Mim
 Mithila

N 

 Nadia Afrin Mim
 Neelanjona Neela
 Nuton
 Nipun Akter
 Nusrat Faria
 Nawshaba
 Naznin Hasan Chumki
 Nazifa Tushi
 Nabila
 Nadia Ahmed
 Naila Nayem

O 

 Olivia Gomez
 Orchita Sporshia

P 

 Prosun Azad
 Puja Cherry
 Purnima
 Popy
 Prova
 Pori Moni
 Peya Bipasha
 Prarthana Fardin Dighi

R 

 Rozina 
 Rosy Afsari
 Rokeya Prachy
 Richi Solaiman
 Rikita Nandini Shimu

S 

 Shomi Kaiser
 Shabnam
 Shabnur
 Shabnaz
 Shahnaz 
 Shabana 
 Shaina Amin
 Shimul Yousuf
 Shila Ahmed
 Sabnam Faria
 Shuchanda
 Sumita Devi
 Sahara 
 Sara Zaker
 Sarika Sabrin
 Sabila Nur
 Sunerah Binte Kamal
 Srabosti Dutta Tinni
 Shimul Yousuf
 Sara Zaker
 Sultana Zaman
 Shokh
 Safa Kabir
 Sohana Saba

T 

 Tania Ahmed
 Tanjin Tisha
 Tasnuva Tisha
 Tasnia Farin
 Tisha
 Tasnova Hoque Elvin
 Tania Brishty
 Tarana Halim

Lists of actors by nationality
Bangladeshi actors
Bangladeshi actresses